The Punakha Dzong, also known as Pungthang Dewa chhenbi Phodrang (meaning "the palace of great happiness or bliss"), is the administrative centre of Punakha District in Punakha, Bhutan. Constructed by Ngawang Namgyal, 1st Zhabdrung Rinpoche, in 1637–38, it is the second oldest and second-largest dzong in Bhutan and one of its most majestic structures. The dzong houses the sacred relics of the southern Drukpa Lineage of the Kagyu school of Tibetan Buddhism, including the Rangjung Kharsapani and the sacred remains of Ngawang Namgyal and the tertön Pema Lingpa.

Punakha Dzong was the administrative center and the seat of the Government of Bhutan until 1955 when the capital was moved to Thimphu. It is listed as a tentative site in Bhutan's Tentative List for UNESCO inclusion.

Geography

The Dzong is located between the Pho Chhu (Male) and Mo Chhu (Female) river in the Punakha–valley. The source of the Mo chu river is in the northern hills of Lighsi and Laya in Bhutan, and in Tibet. The Po Chu River is fed by glaciers in the Lunana region of the Punakha valley. After the confluence of these two rivers, the main river is known as Puna Tsang chu or Sankosh River and flows down through Wangdue Phodrang, crosses the Bhutan–India border at Kalikhola and eventually meets the Brahmaputra River.

In view of the healthy climate in the region, Punakha is the winter capital of Bhutan. The head of the clergy of Bhutan with his entourage of monks spend the winter in this dzong. Jacaranda trees grow around the dzong, blooming with mauve flowers in the spring.

As Punakha Dzong is located at only 1,200 meters, you will not suffer from oxygen shortages as you would in higher places such as Paro Taktsang (Tiger's Nest), so it is a good place for beginner hiker to start from, as you may struggle with altitude sickness in the first few days. Punakha is also the center of Bhutan's second longest suspension bridge (Punakha Suspension Bridge) and is about 7.5 km (4.5 miles) by car to Chimi Lhakhang, the Divine Madman's fertility temple.

History
Legend tells how Zowe Palep, the architect, had a vision in a dream after the Zhabdrung ordered him to sleep under a small structure which contained a statue of the Buddha, known as Dzong Chug "small dzong". In his dream, prompted by the psychic powers of the Zhabdrung, he had a clear vision of a palace for Guru Rinpoche. The vision was imprinted on the architect's mind, enabling him to conceive the plan for the dzong without putting the vision on paper and to build it. On the basis of the dream vision of the architect, the building of the dzong was started in 1637 and completed in 1638, at the place where the Dzong Chug had existed. During this period, Ngawang Namgyal became the first leader of a unified Bhutan, following his concerted efforts to unify the country into one unit.

The dzong was consecrated in the name of Pungthang Dechen Phodrang. In 1639, a commemorative chapel was erected to house the arms seized from the Tibetans who were defeated by the Bhutanese on this spot. The Zhabdrung also set up a monastic order with 600 monks (brought from Cheri Gompa of upper Thimphu valley) and he lived here till his death.

The spire at the top of the utse (the dzong's central tower or the main tower) was added in 1676 by Gyaltsen Tenzin Rabgye–the abbot of the dzong. Further additions were made during the period 1744 to 1763, when Sherab Wangchuk was the ruler. A large thangka known as chenma (great) thoundral of the Zhabdrung was donated to the Dzong by the Desi (ruler). This thangka is displayed during the tshechu held once a year here. The 7th Dalai Lama donated the brass roof for the dzong.
 
The House of Wangchuck currently rules the country. This monarchy was established in 1907. The same year, Punakha Dzong was the site of the coronation of Sir Ugyen Wangchuck as the first Druk Gyalpo. At that time, Punakha was the capital of Bhutan. Three years later, a treaty was signed at Punakha whereby the British agreed not to interfere in Bhutanese internal affairs and Bhutan allowed Britain to direct its foreign affairs.

From 1744 to 1763, the dzong was enlarged substantially during the rule of the 13th desi, when Sherab Wangchuk was the chief abbot of Bhutan. Several fires between 1750 and 1849 caused damages to the Dzong. In the 1897 earthquake, the dzong was severely damaged and also suffered numerous fires. In 1986, the dzong was partially destroyed by fire

Royal wedding

The wedding of the Druk Gyalpo, Jigme Khesar Namgyel Wangchuck, and his fiancée, Jetsun Pema, was held at the Punakha Dzong on 13 October 2011.

Architecture

The dzong is part of the Drukpa Lineage of the Kagyu school of Tibetan Buddhism in Bhutan. It is the second oldest and most majestic dzong in Bhutan built at the orders of Ngawang Namgyal. The materials used in building the Dzong consisted of compacted earth, stones and timber in doors and windows.

The dzong was constructed as an "embodiment of Buddhist values" and was one of the 16 dzongs built by the Zhabdrung during his rule from 1594 to 1651. The defensive fortifications built in the dzong to protect it from enemy attacks consist of a steep wooden draw stairway and a heavy wooden door that is closed at night. After the dzong suffered damage due to a fire, a large prayer hall was added in 1986.

Administrative offices of the dzong, a very large, white-washed stupa and a bodhi tree are located in the first courtyard. Also seen in the same courtyard, on the far left, are a mound of stones and a chapel dedicated to the queen of the nāgas. The residential quarters of monks are located in the second courtyard, with the utse intervening in between the first and the second courtyards. There are two historic halls in this courtyard; one of Ugyen Wangchuck, who subsequently became the King and another hall where the King was decorated in 1905 with the Order of the Knight Commander of the Indian Empire by John Claude White. The third courtyard is at the southernmost end of the dzong where the remains of Pema Lingpa and Ngawang Namgyal are preserved. Machey Lakhang ('machey' literally means "sacred embalmed body") in the third courtyard has the well preserved embalmed body of Zhabdrung. This Lakhang was rebuilt in 1995. The casket containing the embalmed body is not opened at all. However, the place is visited by the King and the Je Khenpo mainly to seek blessings before assuming their offices.

Flash floods resulting from glacial lake outburst flooding in the upper reaches of the valley, are a common occurrence in the Mo Chu and Pho Chu rivers, and in the past caused flooding and damage to the dzong, especially in 1957, 1960 and 1994. Fires and earthquakes have also further added to the problem. In 1996, flash floods in the Pho Chu river damaged the large stupa and caused several deaths.

After a major refurbishing work carried out in the "zorig chusum tradition"  (an ancient tradition of crafts in wood carving, masonry, metal work, painting, and several other skills), the Dzong now has several new Lhakhangs, over 200 new religious images, and several other treasures. A consecration ceremony known as the "Rabney ceremony" performed by the Je Khenpo and the monks of the Dratshang (central monk body) was held from May 13 to 15, 2004, corresponding to the 12th to 14th day of the third Bhutanese month. The restoration works were largely funded by the Government of India and the Dzong stands fully restored to its past glory. After complete restoration of the Dzong to its old glory, notable images, statues and thangkas are displayed in the Dzong. These include murals depicting life story of Buddha done during the rule of the second druk desi. Large gilded statues of Buddha, Guru Rinpoche and Zhabdrung which belong to mid 18th century, and gilded panels on pillars are also here.

A covered wooden cantilever bridge crossing the Mo Chu river was built together with the Dzong in the 17th century. This bridge was washed away by a flash flood in 1957. It was completed in 2008. In 2008, after completion of the cantilever bridge, the new bridge was hailed as a celebration of "100 years of Wangchuck Monarchy in 2008 and to the coronation of His Majesty King Jigme Khesar Namgyel Wangchuck in the Punakha Dzong". Thus, the Dzong has been the venue for coronation of all the kings of Bhutan. A memorial honouring the 23 people who died in the dzong in the glacial floods in 1994 has also been erected just outside the dzong.

Festivals

Domche is the annual festival held at the Dzong, which is largely attended by people from all villages and far places of the district. The ranghung "self-created" image of Avalokiteśvara enshrined in the utse of the dzong (brought by the Zhabdrung from Tibet) is displayed during the festival. During this five-day festival, also known as Punakha festival, held in February/March, there are some very impressive displays. The important display is a re-enactment of the Tibetan invasion of Bhutan in 1639 where the Tibetans were defeated. In this theatrical display, which was conceived by the Zhabdrung, a mock throwing of a relic to the Mo chu river is dramatized.

The final day of the festival marks the display of an image of Zhabdrung followed by a group dance performance by 136 people, dressed as warriors, in the main courtyard. At the end of the performance, the dancers descend down the front entrance of the dzong in revelry – whistling and shouting. The Monks led by the Je Khenpo of the Dzong then parade to the Mo chu river bank with lot of fan fare. Je Khenpo then flings oranges into the river marking the Rangjung Kharsapani, which is considered an offering to the nāgas residing below the river bed. After this act, the traditional mask dances commemorating the construction of the Dzong are performed in the Dzong premises.

Another ritual observed every year at this dzong is called the Lhenkey Dungchhur, and is a worship for departed souls.

References

External links 

Inside information about Punakha Dzong
Pictures of Punakha Dzong
Shabdrung Ngawang Namgyal at the Dharma Dictionary

Palaces in Bhutan
Dzongs in Bhutan
Buildings and structures completed in 1638
1638 establishments in Asia
Drukpa Kagyu monasteries and temples